SEPECAT was an Anglo-French aircraft manufacturer. Established during 1966, its aim was to handle the development and commercialization of the Jaguar, an attack and training aircraft. Organised as a Société Anonyme, the company was joint venture between British Aircraft Corporation and Breguet.

History
The Jaguar programme began in the early 1960s, in response to a British requirement (Air Staff Target 362) for an advanced supersonic jet trainer to replace the Folland Gnat T.1 and Hawker Hunter T.7, and a French requirement (ECAT or École de Combat et d'Appui Tactique, "Tactical Combat Support Trainer") for a cheap, subsonic dual-role trainer and light attack aircraft to replace the Fouga Magister, Lockheed T-33 and Dassault Mystère IV. A memorandum of understanding was signed in May 1965 for the two countries to develop two aircraft, a trainer based on the ECAT, and the larger AFVG (Anglo-French Variable Geometry). Cross-channel negotiations led to the formation of SEPECAT (Société Européenne de Production de l'Avion d'École de Combat et d'Appui Tactique – the "European company for the production of a combat trainer and tactical support aircraft") in 1966 as a joint venture between Breguet and the British Aircraft Corporation to produce the airframe.

Though based in part on the Breguet Br.121, using the same basic configuration and an innovative French-designed landing gear, the Jaguar was built incorporating major elements of design from BAC – notably the wing and high lift devices. Production of components would be split between Breguet and BAC, and the aircraft themselves would be assembled on two production lines; one in the UK and one in France, To avoid any duplication of work, each aircraft component had only one source. The British light strike/tactical support versions were the most demanding design, requiring supersonic performance, superior avionics, a cutting edge nav/attack system of more accuracy and complexity than the French version, moving map display, laser range-finder and marked-target seeker (LRMTS). As a result, the initial Br.121 design needed a thinner wing, redesigned fuselage, a higher rear cockpit, and afterburning engines. While putting on smiling faces for the public, maintaining the illusion of a shared design, the British design departed from the French subsonic Breguet 121 to such a degree that it was effectively a new design.

A separate partnership was formed between Rolls-Royce and Turbomeca to develop the Adour afterburning turbofan engine. The Br.121 was proposed with Turbomeca's Tourmalet engine for ECAT but Breguet preferred the RR RB.172 and their joint venture would use elements of both. The new engine, which would be used for the AFVG as well, would be built in Derby and Tarnos. Previous collaborative efforts between Britain and France had been complicated; the BAC/Dassault AFVG programme had ended in cancellation, while controversy surrounded the development of the supersonic airliner Concorde.

Early on, collaboration between BAC and Breguet went well; however, following Dassault's takeover of Breguet in 1971, the firm encouraged acceptance of its own designs, such as the Super Étendard naval attack aircraft and the Mirage F1, for which it would receive more workshare and profit, over the Jaguar. Specifically, Dassault claimed that the Super Étendard was simpler and cheaper than the Jaguar, successfully persuading the French Navy to order it instead of the marinised Jaguar M, leading to the variant's cancellation in 1973.

In addition to the type's adoption by France and the United Kingdom, the Jaguar was successfully exported abroad as well. As early as 1968, India had been approached as a possible customer for the Jaguar, but had declined, partly on the grounds that it was not yet clear if the French and British would themselves accept the aircraft into service. India had already developed the indigenously Marut fighter-bomber, and was at one point keen to upgrade the type, until such efforts failed. The Indian Air Force (IAF) became the largest single export customer of the Jaguar, placing a $1 billion order for the aircraft in 1978, the Jaguar being chosen ahead of competitors such as the Dassault Mirage F1 and the Saab Viggen after a long and difficult evaluation process. The order involved 40 Jaguars built in Europe at Warton, and 120 licence-built aircraft from Hindustan Aeronautics Limited (HAL) under the local name Shamsher ("Sword of Justice").

See also
 Panavia Aircraft GmbH

References

Notes

Citations

Bibliography

 Barua, Pradeep. The State at War in South Asia. Lincoln, NE: University of Nebraska Press, 2005. .
 Bowman, Martin W. SEPECAT Jaguar. London: Pen and Sword Books, 2007. .
 Cohen, Stephen and Sunil Dasgupta. Arming Without Aiming: India's Military Modernization. Washington, DC: Brookings Institution Press, 2010. .
 "The Decade of the Shamsher: Part One". Air International, Vol. 35, No. 4, October 1988, pp. 175–183. ISSN 0306-5634.
 Eden, Paul. The Encyclopedia of Modern Military Aircraft. London, UK: Amber Books, 2004. .
 Jackson, Paul. "SEPECAT Jaguar". World Air Power Journal. Volume 11, Winter 1992, pp. 52–111. London: Aerospace Publishing, 1992. . ISSN 0959-7050.
 Sekigawa, Eiichiro. "Mitsubishi's Sabre Successor". Air International, Vol. 18, No, 3, March 1980, pp. 117–121, 130–131. Bromley, UK: Fine Scroll. ISSN 0306-5634.
 Taylor, John W. R. Jane's All The World's Aircraft 1980–81. London: Jane's Publishing Company, 1980. .
 Wagner, Paul J. Air Force Tac Recce Aircraft: NATO and Non-aligned Western European Air Force Tactical Reconnaissance Aircraft of the Cold War. Pittsburgh, PA: Dorrance Publishing, 2009. .
 Wallace, William. Britain's Bilateral Links Within Western Europe. London: Routledge and Kegan Paul, 1984. .
 "World News: Jaguar First Flight." Flight International via flightglobal.com, 12 September 1968, p. 391.

Aircraft manufacturers of France
Aircraft manufacturers of the United Kingdom
France–United Kingdom military relations
Joint ventures